Robert Malcolm Deryck Davies, OBE (7 May 1918 – 16 June 1967) was a British Labour Party politician.

He was educated at Reading School, and London and Oxford Universities. From 1949 until his election to Parliament he was Secretary of the Department of Applied Economics at Cambridge University.  He was also a Labour member of Cambridge City Council for East Chesterton ward from 1954 to 1964.  In 1941 he married Katharine Wing. The couple had no children.

At the 1966 general election, he was elected  Member of Parliament for Cambridge, winning the seat by just 991 votes from the Conservatives at his third attempt, after the retirement of Hamilton Kerr.  He had previously contested the seat in the general elections of 1959 and 1964, and also contested the surrounding seat of Cambridgeshire during a 1961 by-election. Regarded as being on the left of the party, he was an opponent of the government's policy on Vietnam, and joined other Labour members in signing a letter supporting a peace march organised by the Campaign for Nuclear Disarmament.

He was admitted to Addenbrooke Hospital, Cambridge, in May 1967 for 'a complete rest and observation', but suffered a heart attack and died a month later, only fifteen months after being elected, aged 49. The resulting by-election for his seat was won by the  Conservative candidate, David Lane.

Descended from a Welsh farming family, his grandfather, Jenkin Davies (1824–1893), was a leading Berkshire agriculturalist and County Councillor. The Davies Family History Website  has details of his pedigree.

References 
Times Guide to the House of Commons, 1966 & October 1974

External links 
 

1918 births
1967 deaths
Labour Party (UK) MPs for English constituencies
UK MPs 1966–1970
People from Chesterton, Cambridge